Orchard Hills is a master-planned community in Irvine, California. It borders Limestone Canyon Regional Park to its east and North Tustin, California to its west. Orchard Hills is located between 261 Highway and 241 Highway. Orchard Hills is home to the Rattlesnake and Syphon Reservoirs.

History 
Orchard Hills was historically inhabited by the Chumash, Alliklik, Kitanemuk, Serrano, Gabrielino Luiseno Cahuilla, and the Kumeyaay tribes., predominantly the Gabrieleno Tribes who are thought to have been Uto-Aztecan speakers. Some researchers believe that the Aztecs descended from California. Orchard Hills is near Irvine Ranch, so it is expected that Gabrieleño farmers and Hunter-gatherers likely farmed acorns, mesquite, Prickly-Pear Cactus, chia seeds, wild cherry, white sage, among other fruits.

European colonization 
From the 17th Century to the Early 19th Century, Spanish rule in California, otherwise known as Alta California ("Upper California"), was limited to trading outposts, villages, forts, and most notably, the Christian Missions of California, which were erected by Junipero Serra. The Mission closest to Orchard Hills is the San Juan Capistrano Mission which was founded in 1776.

Mexican-American war 
When the Mexican–American War broke out, one of its implications was the Bear Flag Revolt, which disrupted native activity in the area near Orchard Hills.

Demographics 
Orchard Hills has a population of 990. Orchard Hills' majority group are Asian Americans who are 68 percent of the population, 24.1 percent being White, 6.7 percent being Hispanic/Latino. A majority of Orchard Hills Residents are female and Orchard Hills has the highest percent of children population out of the Irvine Neighborhoods.

Schools 
Residents of Orchard Hills attend the Orchard Hills K-8 school, and the mascot is a hawk. Orchard Hills School offers various programs such as Robotics, AVID 7/8, and various others

Notable places

Pavillions 
The pavilions is a shopping centre in the Orchard Hills plaza.

Settlers Park 
Settlers park is a stable attraction, being visited by many of its students after-school.

Juniperia 
"Juniperia" is a Micronation located in orchard hills, its official name is the Kingdom of Juniperia.

See also
New Spain
Mexican-American war
Uto-Aztecan languages

References

Neighborhoods in Orange County, California
Irvine, California
California
United States
Villages